David Alcoriza (born October 13, 1968) is an American sports shooter. He competed in the men's double trap event at the 1996 Summer Olympics.

Alcoriza also competed in the United States Army Marksmanship Unit for eight years and, after his shooting career, coached basketball in Tokay, California.

References

External links
 

1968 births
Living people
American male sport shooters
Olympic shooters of the United States
Shooters at the 1996 Summer Olympics
Sportspeople from Columbus, Georgia
20th-century American people